Huangge Auto Town Station is an elevated station of Line 4 of the Guangzhou Metro. It started operations on 30 December 2006. It is located at the junction of Shinan Road and Huangge Road North in the town of Huangge, Nansha District,  next to Guangzhou Toyota Auto Town, a plant operated by Toyota.

Before the station put into service, it was called "Huangge North Station" and "Guangzhou Toyota Auto Town Station" successively. Residents criticized the station name of "Guangzhou Toyota Auto Town Station" for promoting Toyota and its car accessories. So the station name was changed to the current Huangge Auto Town Station later.

Station layout

Exits

References

Railway stations in China opened in 2006
Guangzhou Metro stations in Nansha District